Korean barbecue (gogi-gui, 'meat roast') is a popular method in Korean cuisine of grilling meat, typically beef, pork or chicken. Such dishes are often prepared on gas or charcoal grills built into the dining table itself. Some Korean restaurants that do not have built-in grills provide customers with portable stoves for diners to use at their tables. Alternatively, a chef uses a centrally displayed grill to prepare dishes that are made to order.

The most representative form of gogi-gui is bulgogi, usually made from thinly sliced marinated beef sirloin or tenderloin. Another popular form is galbi, made from marinated beef short ribs. However, gogi-gui also includes many other kinds of marinated and unmarinated meat dishes, and can be divided into several categories. Korean barbecue is popular in its home country, but has also gained popularity worldwide.

History 
Korean BBQ was founded between 37 B.C. to 668 A.D. It was initially called “maekjeok”, which translated to “meat over a fire”, but was then changed to “bulgogi”. It gained its global popularity through Hallyu, more commonly known as the “Korean Wave”,  a term that describes the rise in popularity of Korean culture during the 1990s and 2000s.

Varieties

Marinated barbecue meats

Bulgogi is the most popular variety of Korean barbecue. Before cooking, the meat is marinated with a mixture of soy sauce, sugar, ginger, scallions, sesame oil, garlic and pepper. Pears are also traditionally used in the marinade to help tenderize the meat, but kiwi and pineapple have also been used more recently. It is traditionally cooked using gridirons or perforated dome griddles that sit on braziers, but pan cooking has become common as well.

Galbi is made with beef short ribs, marinated in a sauce that may contain mirin, soy sauce, water, garlic, brown sugar, sugar and sliced onions. It is believed to taste best when grilled with charcoal or soot (숯, burned wood chips).

Jumulleok is short steak marinated with sesame oil, salt and pepper. It is similar to unmarinated gogi-gui, distinguished it from other kinds of meat by its steak-like juicy texture. Jumulleok is also commonly found with sliced duck instead of beef.

Dwaeji bulgogi, or spicy pork, is also a popular gogigui dish. It is different from beef bulgogi in that the marinade is not soy sauce-based, but, instead, is marinated in sauces based on gochujang and/or gochu garu (Korean chili powder). The flavor is usually better when made with fattier cuts of pork, such as pork shoulder or pork belly.

Un-marinated barbecue meats
Chadolbagi or chadolbaegi is a dish made from thinly sliced beef brisket, which is not marinated. It is so thin that it cooks nearly instantly as soon as it is dropped onto a heated pan.

Samgyeopsal is made of thicker strips of unsalted pork belly. It has fatty areas and is tender. In Korea, samgyeopsal is eaten more frequently than chadolbaegi due to the comparatively lower price of pork.

Loins (deungsim, 등심) and boneless ribs (galbisal, 갈비살) are also a popular choice as an unmarinated type of gogigui.

Side dishes
Gogi-gui comes with various banchan (side dishes). The most popular side dishes are rice and kimchi, and a green onion salad called pajeori and a fresh vegetable dish including lettuce, cucumbers, and peppers invariably accompany the meat dishes at restaurants. Other popular side dishes include the spinach side dish (sigeumchi namul/시금치나물), egg roll omelette (gyeran-mari/계란말이), spicy radish salad (mu saengchae/무생채), and a steamed egg soufflé (gyeran-jjim/계란찜). A popular way of eating Korean barbecue is to wrap the meat with lettuce and/or perilla leaves and add condiments such as pajeori (spicy scallion salad) and ssamjang (a spicy paste made of doenjang mixed with gochujang).

Korean barbecue is also popularly paired with alcoholic drinks, such as beer, soju, makgeolli, or wine.

Gallery

See also

 Asado
 Barbecue restaurant
 Jeok
 Korean cuisine
 Yakiniku

References
Notes

Sources

External links
 How to Cook Korean Food at Home - The Official Korea Tourism Guide Site

Korean chicken dishes
Korean beef dishes
Korean pork dishes
Table-cooked dishes